Devra Bhail Deewana is a 2014 Indian, Bhojpuri language film produced and directed by Rajkumar R. Pandey. The film stars Pradeep Pandey ("Chintu"), Manoj Tiwari, Pakhi Hegde, Monalisa and  Sanjay Pandey.

The story of the film deals with the bond of two brothers and a big misunderstanding after the elder brother's marriage. They overcome this and become a happy family.

Cast

Pradeep Pandey ("Chintu") as Rahul
Khursheed Khan as Rahul Friend
Manoj Tiwari 
Pakhi Hegde
Monalisa
Kajal Raghwani
Sanjay Pandey
Brijesh Tripathi
Awadhesh Mishra

Soundtrack

References

2014 films
Indian action films
2010s Hindi-language films
Films directed by Rajkumar R. Pandey
2010s Bhojpuri-language films
2014 action films
2014 multilingual films
Indian multilingual films